Castle Morpeth was a local government district and borough in Northumberland, England.  Its administrative centre was the town of Morpeth.

The district was formed on 1 April 1974 by the merger of the borough of Morpeth and Morpeth Rural District, along with part of Castle Ward Rural District.

The district council was abolished as part of the 2009 structural changes to local government in England effective from 1 April 2009 with responsibilities being transferred to Northumberland County Council, a unitary authority.

Settlements and parishes

The district includes the settlements and parishes of (towns highlighted in bold):

Belsay
Capheaton, Cresswell
East Chevington, Ellington and Linton
Hartburn, Hebron, Heddon-on-the-Wall, Hepscott
Longhirst, Longhorsley, Lynemouth 
Matfen, Meldon, Mitford, Morpeth
Netherwitton
Pegswood, Ponteland
Stamfordham, Stannington, Stobswood
Thirston
Ulgham
Wallington Demesne, Whalton, Widdrington
Tritlington and West Chevington
Widdrington Station and Stobswood

Transport
Castle Morpeth is located along the vital East Coast Main Line rail artery stretching from London to Edinburgh. The rail line offers services to other major intermediate cities such as Newcastle and Peterborough.

Mayors

 1974–75: Dr George Cormack
 1975–76: Geoffrey F. Brown
 1976–77: J Dalton Hutchinson
 1977–78: W. Laurie Hill 
 1978–79: Tom Brown
 1979–80: David Adams
 1980–81: Mrs M. Alice Rowe
 1981–82: W. John Lough 
 1982–83: Geoffrey F. Brown
 1983–84: Miss Isobel Smail [
 1984–85: M. George Green
 1985–86: Mrs Dorothy McBryde
 1986–87: Barnaby J. Dunn
 1987–88: Iain McConnell-Wood
 1988–89: Ian Hunter (Honorary Alderman 1999)
 1989–90: Roger Errington (High Sheriff of Northumberland 1993)
 1990–91: Clive Temple
 1991–92: Jim Turnbull
 1992–93: Trevor Hulbert
 1993–94: M. George Green (2nd term)
 1994–95: Iain McConnell-Wood (2nd term)
 1995–96: Tom Simpson (Honorary Alderman 2003)
 1996–97: Mrs Kay Morris
 1997–98: Mrs Sheila Campbell (Honorary Alderman 2005)
 1998–99: Neil Weatherly (Honorary Alderman 2003)
 1999–00: Ernie Coe (Honorary Alderman 2008)
 2000–01: Frank Harrington (Honorary Alderman 2009)
 2001–02: Bill Cuthbertson
 2002–03: Alan Taylor
 2003–04: Derek Thompson
 2004–05: Mrs Kay Morris (2nd term, Honorary Alderman 2009)
 2005–06: Milburn Douglas
 2006–07: Geoff Proudlock (Honorary Alderman 2008)
 2007–08: Milburn Douglas (2nd term, Honorary Alderman 2009)
 2008–09: Mrs Irene Brumwell

Irene Brumwell became the last Mayor of Castle Morpeth Borough as structural changes to local government in England effective on 1 April 2009 abolished the borough.

See also
Castle Morpeth Borough Council elections

External links
Statistics about the Castle Morpeth borough from the Office for National Statistics Census 2001
Castle Morpeth website
Morpeth Town Council website

English districts abolished in 2009
Former non-metropolitan districts of Northumberland
Former boroughs in England